The Minister for Supplies was created by the Ministers and Secretaries (Amendment) Act 1939, to assist Ireland through World War II, or the Emergency, as it was referred to by the Government of Ireland. Although the legislation creating the new department was not passed until 21 December 1939, it was given retrospective effect, and was deemed to have come into force on 8 September 1939.

The Minister for Supplies was charged with controlling production, distribution and pricing of vital supplies during the Emergency. According to the historian Bryce Evans, Minister Seán Lemass introduced full rationing in Ireland 'too late', ensuring the black market trumped later state attempts at equitable distribution amid the British wartime supply squeeze. Earlier historians had pointed to Lemass's successes in stockpiling essential goods.

The minister's functions were transferred to the Minister for Industry and Commerce on abolition of the office on 1 August 1945. Lemass had been serving in both positions from 1941.

References

See also
Minister for the Co-ordination of Defensive Measures
Irish neutrality during World War II – International relations
Irish Mercantile Marine during World War II

1939 establishments in Ireland
1945 disestablishments in Ireland
Economy of the Republic of Ireland
Independent Ireland in World War II
Supplies
Ministries established in 1939
Ministries disestablished in 1945
Seán Lemass